Ashland is a city in Clay County, Alabama, United States. The population was 2,037 at the 2010 census. The city is the county seat of Clay County.

History
Clay County was formed by an act of the Alabama General Assembly on December 7, 1866. Less than a year later, Ashland was established as the county seat on land donated by Hollingsworth Watts for the construction of a courthouse. In 1871 Ashland was incorporated and named for 19th century statesman Henry Clay's Kentucky estate home.

During the early years, the town grew very rapidly. The town continued to grow with the opening of Alabama's first graphite mine in 1899. When World War I ended, the market for graphite dropped drastically, thus ending the town's growth phase.

The 1930s brought the Great Depression and boll weevil to Ashland that destroyed the cotton industry. Farmers were forced to abandon what had been the community's major industry. Timber, poultry, and cabinet making became the dominant industries by the beginning of the 21st century.

Geography
Ashland is located at  (33.272206, −85.836925).

Alabama State Routes 9 and 77 are the main routes through the city. AL-9 runs through the downtown area, leading northeast  to Lineville and southwest  to Goodwater. AL-77 meets AL-9 in the downtown area, and leads northwest  to Talladega and southeast  to Wadley.

At , Ashland is Alabama's highest elevated county seat.

Climate
The climate in this area is characterized by hot, humid summers and generally mild to cool winters. According to the Köppen Climate Classification system, Ashland has a humid subtropical climate, abbreviated "Cfa" on climate maps.

Demographics

Ashland first appeared on the 1870 U.S. Census as an unincorporated village, incorporating as a town the following year. The 6th beat (precinct) of Clay County also bore the name of Ashland, and has continued to report to date (2010), becoming a census division in 1960. The population of the beat/precinct/census division is as follows: 1870–1,499; 1880–2,178; 1890–2,848; 1900–2,891; 1910–3,581; 1920–4,629; 1930–3,713; 1940–3,757; 1950–3,197; 1960–5,696; 1970–5,852; 1980–6,167; 1990–5,780; 2000–6,515; 2010–6,128. From 1870 to 1950, Ashland was also the largest community in Clay County. It lost that distinction to Lineville beginning in 1960, when the latter eclipsed Ashland by just 2 people (1,612 to 1,610).

2010 Census data
As of the census of 2010, there were 2,037 people, 849 households, and 516 families residing in the city. The racial makeup of the city was 71.5% White, 24.1% Black or African American, 0.7% Asian, 2.0% from other races, and 1.3% from two or more races. Hispanic or Latino of any race were 5.7% of the population.

There were 849 households, out of which 26.0% had children under the age of 18 living with them, 37.3% were married couples living together, 18.1% had a female householder with no husband present, and 39.2% were non-families. 37.2% of all households were made up of individuals, and 18.6% had someone living alone who was 65 years of age or older. The average household size was 2.22 and the average family size was 2.91.

In the city, the population was spread out, with 21.3% under the age of 18, 9.1% from 18 to 24, 24.3% from 25 to 44, 24.9% from 45 to 64, and 20.4% who were 65 years of age or older. The median age was 41.8 years. For every 100 females there were 84.8 males. For every 100 females age 18 and over, there were 90.1 males.

The median income for a household in the city was $30,759, and the median income for a family was $44,659. Males had a median income of $30,360 versus $29,438 for females. The per capita income for the city was $17,258. About 24.4% of families and 20.0% of the population were below the poverty line, including 7.9% of those under age 18 and 29.2 of those age 65 or over.

2020 Census data

As of the 2020 United States census, there were 1,984 people, 677 households, and 333 families residing in the town.

Education
The current Central High School of Clay County and Central Junior High School are in Lineville.

According to the Alabama High School Athletic Association Clay County High School holds seven Class 2A championships.
Football- 1994, 1995, 1996, 2000, 2005
Boys basketball −1991, 1992
Additionally, CCHS was the 1-A State Football Champions in 2002

Media
Radio stations
WCKF 100.7 FM (Classic Country)
WSGN 98.3 FM  (Oldies)
WFAZ 90.9 FM  (God's Country & Chrisitan)

Notable natives
 Howard Ballard, former NFL player
 Hugo Black, Associate Justice of the Supreme Court of the United States from 1937 until 1971. His first law office was on the square in Ashland.
 Hiram Wesley Evans, Imperial Wizard of the Ku Klux Klan from 1922 to 1939.
 Bob Riley, Alabama's 52nd governor

Gallery

References

External links
City of Ashland Web site

Towns in Clay County, Alabama
County seats in Alabama
Populated places established in 1871
1871 establishments in Alabama